Isehan Co., Ltd. (Japanese: 伊勢半) is a Japanese cosmetics manufacturer founded as a family shop in 1825. The company was one of the first to market a branded cosmetics product in 1935 with a saffron-based beni lip-gloss sold in china pots as "Kiss Me" (Japanese キス・ミー). The brand developed to include western style lipsticks, and a larger cosmetics range still marketed today but with English lettering as Kiss Me. The Minato-ku, Tokyo, main branch of Isehan has a small museum on the company's history.

References

External links
 Isehan-Honten Museum of Beni at Google Cultural Institute

Manufacturing companies based in Tokyo
Manufacturing companies established in 1825
Cosmetics companies of Japan
Japanese brands
Japanese companies established in 1825